Menoetius or Menoetes (Menoitios), meaning doomed might, is a name that refers to three distinct beings from Greek mythology:

 Menoetius, a second generation Titan, son of Iapetus and Clymene or Asia, and a brother of Atlas, Prometheus and Epimetheus. Menoetius was killed by Zeus with a flash of lightning in the Titanomachy, and banished to Tartarus. His name means "doomed might", deriving from the Ancient Greek words menos ("might, power") and oitos ("doom, pain"). Hesiod described Menoetius as hubristic, meaning exceedingly prideful and impetuous to the very end. From what his name suggests, along with Hesiod's own account, Menoetius was perhaps the Titan god of violent anger and rash action.
 Menoetes, guard of the cattle of Hades. During Heracles twelfth labor, which required him to steal the hound Cerberus from the Underworld, he slays one of Hades' cattle. A certain Menoetes, son of Keuthonymos, challenges Heracles to a wrestling match, during which Heracles hugs him and breaks his ribs before Persephone intervenes.
 Menoetius from Opus was one of the Argonauts, and son of Actor and Aegina. He was the father of Patroclus and Myrto by either Damocrateia, Sthenele, Philomela  Polymele, or Periopis.  Among the settlers of Locris, Menoetius was chiefly honored by King Opus II, son of Zeus and Protogeneia.

Notes

References 
 Apollodorus, The Library with an English Translation by Sir James George Frazer, F.B.A., F.R.S. in 2 Volumes, Cambridge, MA, Harvard University Press; London, William Heinemann Ltd. 1921. . Online version at the Perseus Digital Library. Greek text available from the same website.
 Hesiod, Theogony, in The Homeric Hymns and Homerica with an English Translation by Hugh G. Evelyn-White, Cambridge, Massachusetts, Harvard University Press; London, William Heinemann Ltd. 1914. Online version at the Perseus Digital Library.
 Homer, The Iliad with an English Translation by A.T. Murray, Ph.D. in two volumes. Cambridge, MA., Harvard University Press; London, William Heinemann, Ltd. 1924. Online version at the Perseus Digital Library.
 Homer, Homeri Opera in five volumes. Oxford, Oxford University Press. 1920. Greek text available at the Perseus Digital Library.
 Pindar, Odes translated by Diane Arnson Svarlien. 1990. Online version at the Perseus Digital Library.
 Pindar, The Odes of Pindar including the Principal Fragments with an Introduction and an English Translation by Sir John Sandys, Litt.D., FBA. Cambridge, MA., Harvard University Press; London, William Heinemann Ltd. 1937. Greek text available at the Perseus Digital Library.
Tzetzes, John, Allegories of the Iliad translated by Goldwyn, Adam J. and Kokkini, Dimitra. Dumbarton Oaks Medieval Library, Harvard University Press, 2015. 

Titans (mythology)
Greek underworld
Argonauts
Characters in the Argonautica
Phocian characters in Greek mythology
Condemned souls in Tartarus
Locrian mythology
Mythology of Heracles